I'll Love You More is a studio album by American country artist Jeannie Seely. Her third studio record, it was released in February 1968 on Monument Records and was produced by Fred Foster. The album included two singles, one of which became a hit. That song, "I'll Love You More (Than You'll Need)" was a top ten hit in early 1968, leading to the release of the album.

Background and content
I'll Love You More was recorded in several sessions beginning in September 1967 and ending in September 1968. All sessions were held at the Fred Foster Recording Studio in Nashville, Tennessee and were produced by Foster himself. The album contained 11 tracks previously unrecorded by Seely. I'll Love You More included cover versions of songs recorded by other artists. Such covers included "If My Heart Had Windows", originally recorded by George Jones. A second cover was "Mr. Record Man", which was originally cut by Willie Nelson in 1961. The album also contained songs written by Seely's then-husband, songwriter Hank Cochran. Six of the record's tracks were either written or co-written by Cochran. The ninth track, "You've Changed Everything About Me But My Name", was co-written by Cochran and Seely.

Release and reception

I'll Love You More was officially released in February 1968 on Monument Records in a vinyl record format. Five songs were featured on the record's first side and six appeared on the opposite side. It was later released in a digital format. The record peaked at number 30 on the Billboard Top Country Albums chart in April 1968.

The release included two singles issued in 1967. The first single, "When It's Over", became a minor hit in 1967 and reached number 39 on the Billboard Hot Country Singles chart. The album's second single became a major hit. "I'll Love You More (Than You'll Need)" peaked at number 10 on the country songs chart, becoming Seely's second top ten single. In later years, the album received three out of five stars from Allmusic.

Track listing

Original edition

Digital edition

Personnel
All credits are adapted from the liner notes of I'll Love You More.

 Fred Foster – producer
 Bill Forshee – cover
 Ken Kim – photography
 Brent Maher – technician 
 Jeannie Seely – lead vocals
 Tommy Strong – engineering

Chart performance

Release history

References

1968 albums
Monument Records albums
Jeannie Seely albums
Albums produced by Fred Foster